The Anton and Mary Agnes Karpen House is a historic house at 818 1st Street West in Webster, South Dakota.  It is a two-story wood frame house, built in 1917 for Anton Karpen, the owner of a local lumberyard.  The house is an excellent local example of Craftsman styling, with extended eaves showing exposed rafters, bands of windows, the use of colored glass, and a built-in fieldstone fireplace.  The house was later owned by Lewis Bicknell, a prominent local attorney.

The house was listed on the National Register of Historic Places in 2008.

References

Houses on the National Register of Historic Places in South Dakota
Houses completed in 1917
Houses in Day County, South Dakota
National Register of Historic Places in Day County, South Dakota